The Steinhude pike from 1772 is said to be the first submarine built in Germany.

The engineer and officer Jakob Chrysostomus Praetorius drafted a construction made of oak wood, in the shape of a fish with sails and mobile rear. Allegedly, the plan was presented to William, Count of Schaumburg-Lippe in 1762. After an initial rejection it was built in 1772 at the island fortress Wilhelmstein in a reduced version. It is said to have dived in the Steinhuder Meer, a large lake, for 12 minutes. However, as the lake has a maximum depth of  this claim is dubious.

While the range of the Steinhude pike must have been limited, Count Wilhelm, according to a local legend, wanted to sail to Portugal with it. However, its military purpose was to connect the fortification with the allies of Schaumburg-Lippe, especially Britain, Braunschweig-Lüneburg and Prussia in the event of a siege.

Today a model and construction plans are exhibited in the military museum Wilhelmstein. The Wilhelmstein was the planned base for the Steinhude pike.

References

External links 
 steinhuder-meer.de (in German) date retrieved 21 August 2016

Steinhuder Meer
Submarines of Germany
German inventions
Age of Sail submarines
1772 ships